Hentziectypus florens is a species of comb-footed spider in the family Theridiidae. It is found from the US to Panama, and Cuba.

References

Theridiidae
Spiders described in 1896
Spiders of North America
Spiders of the Caribbean